Dr. Mohammad Jafar Mahjoub 
(23 August 1924 – 17 February 1996) was a prominent Iranian scholar of Persian literature, essayist, translator and teacher.

Life 

Dr. Mahjoub was born in Tehran in 1924 and graduated from the prestigious Alborz High School in 1944. He obtained his bachelor's degree in political science from Tehran University in 1947.

During this time he was employed as a stenographer at the Majlis, where he was recruited into the leftist Tudeh Party.  He continued his affiliation with the Tudeh Party for some ten years, working in the press division and authoring unsigned editorials.  He later severed all ties with the party and focused strictly on scholarly pursuits.

He obtained a second bachelor's degree in 1954 and his Ph.D. in Persian literature from Tehran University in 1963. His dissertation on the Khorasani style in Persian poetry was published as a book and is regarded as a standard text on the subject.

He taught Persian literature at the Teacher Training College (Tarbiat Moallem University), becoming full professor in 1968, and at Tehran University.  He was a visiting professor at Oxford University in the academic year 1971-72, and a guest professor at the University of Strasbourg in 1972-73.  He was Iran's cultural attaché to Pakistan from 1974 to 1979.

After the 1979 Iranian Revolution he was appointed as the head of  Academy of Persian Language and Literature and the National Academy for the Arts, a post he held until 1980.

Life in exile

In 1980 Dr. Mahjoub left Iran for Paris, giving weekly lectures on Persian folk literature at the École Pierre Brossolette.  He returned to the University of Strasbourg teaching there from 1982 to 1984 and was the president of the Persian Cultural Society in Paris from 1986 to 1993.

He later moved to the United States and began teaching at the University of California, Berkeley in 1991 until his death from prostate cancer in 1996.

Selected works

Dr. Mahjoub is known for his works on Iranian folk literature and language, for his scholarly   editorship of several classical texts, as a translator and a consummate academic and teacher.

Author 

 Dictionary of Folk Expressions (with Mohammad-Ali Jamalzadeh)
 On Kalila-o Demna, 1960
 Khorasani Style in Persian Poetry, 1966
 Best of Ferdowsi, 1993 (essays)
 Ashes of Life, 2000 (essays)
 Folk literature of Iran, 2003 (essays)

Scholarly editor 

 Works of Qa'ani Shirazi, 1957
 Vis O Ramin, 1958
 Works of Soroush Esfahani, 1960
 Amir Arsalan, 1961
 Complete Works of Iraj Mirza, 1962
 Modalities of Truth (Tara-eq al-haqa-eq), 1966
 Royal Book of Chivalry (Fotovat-nama-ye Soltani), 1971
 Complete Works of Obeid Zakani, 1999

Translations 

 Steinbeck's The Pearl (from French), 1949
 Jack London's South Sea Tales, 1951
 Jack London's The Iron Heel, 1953 (under pseudonym M. Sobhdam)
 Dostoyevsky's The House of the Dead, 1956

References

External links 

Iranian literary scholars
Iranian scholars
Iranian translators
Iranian literary critics
Academic staff of Kharazmi University
Alborz High School alumni
Persian-language writers
Iranian emigrants to France
Iranian emigrants to the United States
1924 births
1996 deaths
20th-century translators
Iranian expatriates in Pakistan
Exiles of the Iranian Revolution in the United States
Exiles of the Iranian Revolution in France
Faculty of Letters and Humanities of the University of Tehran alumni
Cultural attachés